Dance of the Idiots is the first Koby Israelite album to be released on the Tzadik Records imprint in 2003.

Track listing 
 "Saints and dates" - 3:37
 "Toledo five four" - 4:33
 "If that makes any sense" - 5:46
 "Diego" - 1:51
 "Battersea blues" - 7:59
 "I used to be cool" - 5:15
 "In the meantime" - 6:20
 "Wanna Dance" - 5:36
 "Truah" - 4:30
 "2nd of Tamuz" - 3:35
 "Dance of the Idiots" - 2:47
 "Happylouge" - 1:44

Personnel 
 Koby Israelite: drums, vocals, electric guitar, pocket clarinet, flutes, piano, accordion, keyboard, melodica, percussion, programming
 Levi Levin: vocals
 Marcel Mamaliga: violin
 Ofir Gal: guitar, rhythm guitar
 Stefan Redtenbacher: bass guitar
 Gilad Atzmon: clarinet, baritone and tenor saxophones
 Sid Gauld: trumpet, flugel horn
 Reut Regev: trombone
 Howard Davies: didgeridoo
 Yaron Stavi: upright bass, electric upright bass
 Marin: accordion

References 

2003 albums
Tzadik Records albums
Koby Israelite albums